Jado Hasanbegović (born January 8, 1948), is a Yugoslav retired footballer who played in the North American Soccer League

Club career
In 1975, Hasanbegović signed with the San Antonio Thunder.  In 1977, he played for the Connecticut Bicentennials and in 1978, he moved to the Chicago Sting.  In 1979, the Sting traded him to the Memphis Rogues where he played two seasons.

External links
 NASL career stats

1948 births
Living people
Footballers from Sarajevo
Association football forwards
Bosnia and Herzegovina footballers
Yugoslav footballers
San Antonio Thunder players
Connecticut Bicentennials players
Chicago Sting (NASL) players
Memphis Rogues players
North American Soccer League (1968–1984) indoor players
North American Soccer League (1968–1984) players
Yugoslav expatriate footballers
Expatriate soccer players in the United States
Yugoslav expatriate sportspeople in the United States